Imre Kovács (26 November 1921 – 9 March 1996) was a Hungarian football midfielder who played for Hungary in the 1954 FIFA World Cup. He also played for MTK Budapest FC. He won a gold medal in football at the 1952 Summer Olympics.

His brother, József, was also a footballer.

References

External links
 

1921 births
1996 deaths
Footballers from Budapest
Hungarian footballers
Hungary international footballers
Association football midfielders
MTK Budapest FC players
1954 FIFA World Cup players
Olympic footballers of Hungary
Footballers at the 1952 Summer Olympics
Olympic gold medalists for Hungary
Hungarian football managers
Fehérvár FC managers
MTK Budapest FC managers
Újpest FC managers
Győri ETO FC managers
Pécsi MFC managers
Nemzeti Bajnokság I managers